Grace Yeager is the assumed title of a 1931–1932 United States television series which aired on New York City television station W2XAB. Among the earliest regularly-scheduled series, it featured the singer of the same name, who was a soprano. According to an article in the October 31, 1931 edition of The New York Sun titled W2XAB Source of Features, Yeager had previously been a member of the San Carlos Opera Company. None of the episodes still exist, as it aired live, and practical methods to record live television did not exist until 1947.

Scheduling
The series typically aired on Tuesdays, at the end of the programming day. For example, one episode was scheduled at 10:45 pm on September 29, 1931 and was preceded by Boyd Wagner, while another episode was scheduled for January 26, 1932 at 10:45PM and was preceded by Bert McElfresh.

References

External links
Grace Yeager on IMDb

1931 American television series debuts
1932 American television series endings
1930s American television series
American live television series
Lost television shows
American music television series
Black-and-white American television shows
Local music television shows in the United States